Joseph Secord (August 22, 1897 – August 21, 1970) was an American football player.  He played professionally as a Center for the Green Bay Packers of the National Football League (NFL) in 1922.

Biography
Secord was born on August 22, 1897 in Green Bay, Wisconsin.

See also
 List of Green Bay Packers players

References

1897 births
1970 deaths
American football centers
Green Bay Packers players
Sportspeople from Green Bay, Wisconsin
Players of American football from Wisconsin